Kingsley Anketell Henderson  (15 December 1883 – 6 April 1942) was an Australian architect and businessman. He ran a successful firm in Melbourne that specialised in commercial buildings. He was involved in the creation of the United Australia Party (UAP), holding office in its organisational wing in Victoria, and served on the Malvern City Council.

Early life
Henderson was born on 15 December 1883 in Brighton, Victoria. He was one of four children born to Mary Louisa (née Andrew) and Anketell Matthew Henderson. His mother was born in England and his father, also an architect, was born in Ireland. Henderson was educated at Cumloden College in St Kilda East. He later took classes at the University of Melbourne and Melbourne Technical College.

Career

Henderson was articled to his father in 1901 and in 1906 joined him as a partner in the firm of Anketell & K. Henderson, later known as A. & K. Henderson & Partners. His father died in 1922 and he was later joined in partnership by Rodney Alsop and Marcus Martin. After his own death the practice was carried on by Cedric Staughton until the early 1960s. Henderson was a fellow of the Royal Australian Institute of Architects (RAIA) and Royal British Institute of Architects. He served twice as president of the Federal Council of the RAIA and twice as president of the Royal Victorian Institute of Architects (RVIA). He later became chairman of the Architects' Registration Board of Victoria and also lectured in architecture at the University of Melbourne.

Henderson "placed great emphasis on the functional and commercial aspect of city office planning, being especially adept at achieving the maximum natural light and space to let". His practice specialised in commercial office buildings but also designed for universities, hospitals and some residential clients, receiving work across Australia and New Zealand. It won a number of architectural awards and competitions, including two RVIA medals for street architecture – one in 1931 for Lyric House on Collins Street, Melbourne, and another in 1935 for Shell Corner at the intersection of Bourke Street and William Street. Henderson himself specialised in the functional requirements of office buildings, with others contributing the façades. The firm developed a house style for the T & G Mutual Life Assurance Society, building offices across ten cities.
In Wellington, the company designed the T & G Building and a new building for the D.I.C. department store.

Other interests
Henderson held a number of company directorships, including Argus and Australasian Ltd (holding company of The Argus and The Australasian), stockbroking firm Were's, investment trusts National Reliance and Capel Court (Aust) Ltd, and the Australian subsidiaries of Eagle Star Insurance and the Chevron Corporation. He was elected chairman of Argus and Australasian in 1940.

In 1917, Henderson was elected to the Malvern City Council, serving until 1922. He had a long history of involvement in the organisational wings of various movements opposed to the Australian Labor Party (ALP). He was a fiscal conservative, opposing default on government debts during the Great Depression. In February 1931, Henderson became secretary of the Australian Citizens' League, which soon became the Victorian branch of the All for Australia League and claimed 70,000 members. He was the final member of the so-called "Group of Six" that helped convince former ALP minister Joseph Lyons to lead a new political party, the United Australia Party (UAP). He became a close friend of Lyons, prime minister from 1932, and Lyons frequently stayed with him when he visited Melbourne. He was a pallbearer at Lyons' funeral in 1939.

After the formation of the UAP, Henderson became president of the party's Victorian branch. However, he resigned the position after only a few months in protest at the parliamentary UAP's decision to accept the Premiers' Plan. He was reportedly asked to stand as a candidate at the 1935 Fawkner by-election, but declined for business reasons.

Personal life
Henderson married Ruve Cutts Poolman in 1909. The couple had no children. He died suddenly at his vacation home in Portsea, Victoria, on 7 April 1942, at the age of 58.

Henderson was appointed Commander of the Order of St Michael and St George (CMG) in 1937. He was president of the Melbourne Savage Club from 1933 to 1939.

References

Further reading

1883 births
1942 deaths
Architects from Melbourne
United Australia Party
Australian people of English descent
Australian people of Irish descent
Australian corporate directors
People from Brighton, Victoria